The Institute of Technology Tallaght (also known as ITT or IT Tallaght) (Irish: Institiúid Teicneolaíochta, Tamhlacht) was a third-level institution in Tallaght, the largest suburb of Dublin, Ireland. Established in 1992, IT Tallaght offered degree and postgraduate courses as well as adult education courses. On 1 January 2019 it was dissolved and its operations merged into the new Technological University Dublin (TUD). Its campus is now the Tallaght Campus of TUD.

History
The institute was established as Tallaght Regional Technical College, in 1992, and was at the time the final new Regional Technical College opened in Ireland. It was built on lands donated for educational use to the Irish government by the Dominican Orders, St. Mary's Priory lands, in Tallaght. Qualifications were accredited by the NCEA (the forerunner to HETAC).

The institute adopted the abbreviated title of "ITT Dublin" in 2005, to differentiate it from IT Tralee; this did not change the legal name which continued to be "Institute of Technology, Tallaght" as stated in the Institutes of Technology Act, 2006. In 2016, the institute re-branded as ITT.

From 2011, IT Tallaght validated Theology degrees from The Priory Institute, located adjacent to the campus in Tallaght.

In 2013, it was announced that IT Tallaght, IT Blanchardstown and the Dublin Institute of Technology intended to apply for Technical University Status. On 1 January 2019, this Technical University was founded under the name of 'Technological University Dublin', amalgamating all three institutions.

Faculties and courses
The institute offered a variety of courses, including Higher Certificates and Bachelor's Degrees as well as postgraduate courses in the schools of accountancy, business, computing, engineering, humanities and science.

Student life
IT Tallaght had many clubs and societies for students, including Drama, Radio, Soccer, Martial Arts, Computing and Snow Sports.

The institute also had a Radio Society broadcasting as "ITTFM" on 99.1FM. It broadcast twice annually, in February in line with the institute's RAG (Raising And Giving) week, and also in September for Freshers Week. When not broadcasting on FM, it streamed online through its website, www.ittfm.ie.

IT Tallaght was in the process of redeveloping land donated by the Dominicans of St Mary's Priory (with whom ITT worked closely in providing theology courses at The Priory Institute), for use as sports pitches.

Technical
The institute was the hub of the ITnet network.

See also
 Education in the Republic of Ireland
 Third-level education in the Republic of Ireland

References

External links
 Official site

Education in South Dublin (county)
Former universities and colleges in the Republic of Ireland
Educational institutions disestablished in 2019
2019 disestablishments in Ireland
Tallaght, Institute of Technology
Tallaght
Tallaght
1992 establishments in Ireland
Educational institutions established in 1992